Lestidium prolixum is a species of fish. It is found in the waters of Japan and China. 

References 

Masuda, H., K. Amaoka, C. Araga, T. Uyeno and T. Yoshino, 1984. The fishes of the Japanese Archipelago. Vol. 1. Tokai University Press, Tokyo, Japan. 437 p. 

Paralepididae
Fish of the Pacific Ocean
Fish of Japan
Fish of China
Fish described in 1953